Green Valley is an unincorporated community and census-designated place (CDP) in Pima County, Arizona, United States. The population was 22,616 at the 2020 census.

Geography
Green Valley is located along the western side of the Santa Cruz River at  (31.8556, -111.0001). Continental is to the east of Green Valley, on the other side of the river.

Surrounded by copper mines, and near the cycling, hiking and birding areas of the Santa Rita Mountains, Green Valley is an unincorporated retirement community composed of 59 Homeowner Associations.

The largest of the mines are the Sierrita Mine owned by Freeport-McMoRan and the Mission Mine of ASARCO. Compared to other mines in Arizona the two mines are large; Sierrita is low-grade.

Climate
Green Valley has a borderline hot semi-arid/hot desert climate (Köppen BSh/BWh) with three seasons: a warm to mild winter with chilly nights from October through March; a hot, extremely dry summer season from April to late June; and a hot, relatively humid monsoon season from July through September. Outside monsoon season, rainfall is uniformly scarce, having exceeded  only in October 2000 amongst other months.

Temperatures are uniformly hot during the summer and monsoon seasons, with  exceeded on 154 days during an average year, and 77 nights failing to fall below , including every night during August 2011. Frosts occur 37 nights per winter on average, and daytime highs fail to top  on nine days.

Demographics

2010 census
As of the census of 2010, there were 21,391 people residing in Green Valley. The population density was 663.4 people per square mile. There were 17,322 housing units. The racial makeup of the CDP was 93.4% non-Hispanic White, 0.4% Black or African American, 0.3% Native American, 0.7% Asian, 0.4% from other races, and 0.7% from two or more races. 4.9% of the population were Hispanic or Latino of any race.

The median income for a household in Green Valley was $46,732 in 2014 dollars. The per capita income for the CDP was $35,416. 4.6% of the population was below the poverty line.

2000 census
As of the census of 2000, there were 17,283 people, 9,995 households, and 6,296 families residing in the CDP. The racial makeup of the CDP was 98.4% White, 0.2% Black or African American, 0.2% Native American, 0.3% Asian, 0.1% Pacific Islander, 0.4% from other races, and 0.5% from two or more races. 2.3% of the population were Hispanic or Latino of any race.

There were 9,995 households, out of which 1.5% had children under the age of 18 living with them, 59.8% were married couples living together, 2.5% had a female householder with no husband present, and 37.0% were non-families. 34.1% of all households were made up of individuals, and 28.5% had someone living alone who was 65 years of age or older. The average household size was 1.71 and the average family size was 2.07.

In the CDP, the population consisted of 1.6% of inhabitants under the age of 18, 0.7% from 18 to 24, 2.8% from 25 to 44, 21.7% from 45 to 64, and 73.3% who were 65 years of age or older. The median age was 72 years. For every 100 females, there were 79.7 males. For every 100 females age 18 and over, there were 79.3 males.

The median income for a household in the CDP was $40,213, and the median income for a family was $48,369. Males had a median income of $34,500 versus $25,932 for females. The per capita income for the CDP was $31,138. About 1.7% of families and 3.0% of the population were below the poverty line, including 3.1% of those under age 18 and 2.8% of those age 65 or over.

Government
As an unincorporated community, most government services are provided by Pima County. The Green Valley Council, a community association, represents Green Valley to the county government. A second community association, Green Valley Recreation, provides recreation services to Green Valley.

Green Valley Fire District provides fire and emergency services to Green Valley.

Transportation
Green Valley is served by Sun Shuttle service to Tucson.

Water sustainability

According to a 2007 report by Pima County,  of water was pumped from the aquifer in the Upper Santa Cruz Valley in 2006, with 85 percent of that water being used for mining and agriculture. The remaining 15 percent was split between water used for golf courses and residential/commercial water use. The report explains that "The Green Valley area does not have a sustainable water supply given current groundwater pumping rates... the water table in Green Valley has been declining in past years, and is expected to decline even faster as water demands [continue to increase]...". The report concludes that "Water supplies will become critical within the next ten years."

The original 2007 report from Pima County contained a number of recommendations. Four out of five of the recommendations suggested taking advantage the "Central Arizona Project (CAP) renewable water supplies, as well as recharge of the same". The report states, "the size of a pipeline that would convey Central Arizona Project water for direct use or recharge for the entire Upper Basin would need to be at least 72 inches in diameter." As of 2017 one 36" CAP pipeline has been completed with a second 36" CAP pipeline slated for completion in the later part of 2017. (Note, however, that two 36-inch pipes provide only one half the capacity of a single 72-inch pipe, because capacity scales with cross-sectional area, not with diameter.)

The Upper Santa Cruz Valley has several major water users, all pumping water out of the same aquifer. Most area water users are for-profit companies. ASARCO-Mission Mine, Freeport-McMoRan Sierrita Mine and Farmers Investment Co. (farming) are industrial scale water users. Residential water is provided by Farmers Water Company, Sahuarita Water Company, Las Quintas Serenas Water Company, Quail Creek Water Company, Community Water Company of Green Valley (a nonprofit member owned cooperative), and the Green Valley Water District (a governmental water utility). The proliferation of water companies can be partially explained by the fact that Arizona water law places few limits on the amount of water that can be pumped with costs limited only to drilling, pumping, distribution, etc. Since 2007 the Upper Santa Cruz Providers and Users Group (USCPUG) has been working to bring all local water entities, including the Town of Sahuarita, to the same table. Most of the water users and utilities are now members of USCPUG. The organization has published an analysis and projection of area water use through 2030. It has joined with the U S Bureau of Reclamation to lay the groundwork for transportation and use of Colorado River water from the Central Arizona Project canal to greatly reduce reliance on pumping groundwater. If a system is successfully completed, the excess pumping will be largely or fully eliminated. The process through design and construction is expected to take several years with funding being the major challenge.

Attractions
In 2005 Green Valley was the host of the SAE Mini Baja 100 competition. Mini Baja vehicles are custom made by students. In this case there were about 60 teams from various universities, including some from Canada. ETS – École de technologie supérieure of the Université du Québec, from Montreal, Quebec, Canada, won the competition.

Green Valley is home to the Titan Missile Museum America's largest nuclear weapons museum.

References

External links

Green Valley Sahuarita Chamber of Commerce and Visitor Center
Upper Santa Cruz Providers and Users Group

Census-designated places in Pima County, Arizona
Retirement communities
Populated places in the Sonoran Desert